Yadava Prakaasa was a Bhedabheda Vedanta scholar and a contemporary of Vaishnava Acharya Ramanuja. He was one of the teachers of Ramanuja during the latter's early years in Kanchi. It is said that Ramanuja joined Yadava Prakaasa's school while he was only sixteen years old.

However severe differences rose between them early on, over the interpretation of several Vedic texts and scriptures of Hinduism like Chandogya Upanishad. This eventually led Ramanuja to break away from Yadava Prakaasa and expound his own school of thought known as Vishishtadvaita.

According to the Sri Vaishnava traditions, when Ramanuja was a student under Yadava Prakasa, the latter grew jealous of Ramanuja's rise to fame. So Yadava Prakasa tried to get rid of Ramanuja during a tour to the Ganges in north India. Govinda, Ramanuja's cousin, realised this and warned Ramanuja who then left the group and escaped to Kanchi with the help of an elderly hunter couple. Later Yadava Prakasa realised his folly and became a disciple under Ramanuja.

Sources

References 

Hindu philosophers and theologians
Indian theologians
Tamil scholars
Scholars from Tamil Nadu